Andreessen may refer to:

 Marc Andreessen, American venture capitalist and software engineer
 Laura Arrillaga-Andreessen, American philanthropist, wife of Marc Andreessen
 Andreessen Horowitz, venture capital firm founded in 2009 by Marc Andreessen and Ben Horowitz

See also 
 Andriessen
 Andreassen
 Andreasson
 Andresen
 Andersen